Simbach is a market town and municipality in the district of Dingolfing-Landau, Bavaria, Germany. As of 2020, it had a population of around 4,000 and an area of 51.23 km². 

Simbach consists of the market town of Simbach, 10 villages and more than 100 hamlets and isolated dwellings. The largest villages are Haunersdorf (in the north) and Ruhstorf (in the south). The area around Simbach is still characterized by agriculture. The largest employer is the Fleischer company, which produces canned vegetables.

History
806 - The town is first mentioned in official documents
13th century - The town received the title Markt
1496 - Construction of St. Bartholomäus Church was completed
c. 1634 - The town was struck by plague
1658 - Part of the town was destroyed by fire
1670 - A second school building, the Deiritzhaus, was built
1736 - The church was extended in the baroque style
1972 - Communal reform took place

References

External links
Official homepage

Dingolfing-Landau